Easter orchid is the common name of one of three fragrant orchids:
 Cattleya mossiae, a native of Venezuela
 Cattleya schroederae, a native of Colombia
 Earina autumnalis, a native of New Zealand